Insomnia is the sixth studio album by American rock band Hed PE, released on July 17, 2007.

Music 
Hed PE has cited thrash metal bands such as Slayer as an influence on the musical style of Insomnia.

Release and reception 

Insomnia peaked at #16 on the Top Independent Albums chart, and at #138 on the Billboard 200.

The album's lead single, "Suffa", became one of the most requested tracks at Sirius Satellite Radio's Hard Attack, while the song's music video was voted one of the Top 10 of 2007 on MTV's Headbangers Ball.

Track listing

Personnel

(Hed) Planet Earth
Jahred Gomes – Vocals
Jaxon – Guitar
Doug «DJ Product 1969 ©» Boyce – Turntables
Mark «Mawk» Young – Bass
Devin Lebsack – Drums

Production
Produced by Jahred Gomes, Brad X & Kevin Zinger
Engineered by Patrick Shevelin
Mixed by Jahred Gomes
Mastered by Tom Baker, @ Precision Mastering, Los Angeles, California
Various punk rock back ups by The Rabbi Michael Zimmerman
Management by Kevin Zinger & Ivory Daniel (The Regime)
Cover concept & art direction by Casey Quintal & Jahred Gomes
Artwork & layout by Casey Quintal

References

2007 albums
Hed PE albums
Suburban Noize Records albums